Michael Mantenuto (May 13, 1981  April 24, 2017) was an American film actor, college ice hockey player, and Army non-commissioned officer, best known for his performance as Olympic ice hockey star Jack O'Callahan in the 2004 Disney biopic Miracle.

Early life and sports 

Michael Mantenuto was born in Holliston, Massachusetts. He is an alumnus of the University of Maine, where he played one season for the Maine Black Bears men's ice hockey squad; following that season he transferred to the University of Massachusetts at Boston and played one additional season for their team. His time playing hockey allotted him the opportunity to audition for, and ultimately win, the role of Jack O'Callahan, a player on the 1980 Olympic men's ice hockey team, who beat the Soviet Union team in what is now referred to as the "Miracle on Ice".

Film career and U.S. Army service 

Mantenuto did not actively pursue an acting career, appearing in only two other films, including the Matthew McConaughey feature Surfer, Dude. He ultimately enlisted in the United States Army and served as a Special Forces communications sergeant and dog handler ("Green Beret"). Mantenuto was part of ODA 1222, B Co., 2nd BN, 1st Special Forces Group, and HHC, 1st Special Forces Group, according to his Army Special Operations Command bio in 2016 he was deployed in support of Operation Inherent Resolve. Army Times reported that during his service he was awarded the Army Commendation Medal, three Army Achievement Medals, three Good Conduct Medals and the Global War on Terrorism Service Medal. Additionally, Mantenuto created and led a mental health and substance abuse program for soldiers under the supervision of his command.

Death 

On April 24, 2017, Mantenuto was found dead of a self-inflicted gunshot wound at the age of 35 in Des Moines, Washington.

References

External links 

 
 
 Career stats at the Internet Hockey Database
 

1981 births
University of Maine alumni
Suicides by firearm in Washington (state)
People from Holliston, Massachusetts
United States Army non-commissioned officers
Maine Black Bears men's ice hockey players
American male film actors
21st-century American male actors
Male actors from Massachusetts
2017 suicides
United States Army personnel of the Iraq War
Sportspeople from Middlesex County, Massachusetts